Dunn's climbing salamander (Bolitoglossa dunni) is a species of salamander in the family Plethodontidae.
It is found in Guatemala and Honduras.
Its natural habitat is subtropical or tropical moist montane forests.
It is threatened by habitat loss.

References

Bolitoglossa
Taxonomy articles created by Polbot
Amphibians described in 1933